Uapaca is a genus of plant, in the family Phyllanthaceae  first described as a genus in 1858. It is the only genus comprised in the tribe Uapaceae. The genus is native to Africa and Madagascar. Uapaca is dioecious, with male and female flowers on separate plants.

species

formerly included
moved  Drypetes 
Uapaca griffithii - Drypetes riseleyi

References

Flora of Africa
Phyllanthaceae
Phyllanthaceae genera
Taxa named by Henri Ernest Baillon
Dioecious plants